Khivali (also Romanized as Khīvalī; also known as Ḩīvalī and Khīvahlī) is a village in Sheykh Musa Rural District, in the Central District of Aqqala County, Golestan Province, Iran. At the 2006 census, its population was 959, in 197 families.

References 

Populated places in Aqqala County